Leontyev, Leontief, Leontiev, Leontjew, Leontjev, or Leont'ev and Leontyeva (Леонтьева; feminine) is a Russian surname. Notable people with the surname include:

 Alexei Leontyev (1917–?), Soviet mathematician
 Alexei Leontyev (1716–1786), one of the first Russian sinologists
 Aleksei N. Leontiev (1903–1979), Soviet psychologist, the founder of activity theory
 Aleksei A. Leontiev (1936–2004), Soviet psychologist and linguist, one of the founders of the Soviet psycholinguistics, the son of Aleksei N. Leontiev
 Konstantin Leontiev (1831–1891), Russian philosopher
 Lev Leontiev (1901–?), Soviet economist
 Mikhail Leontiev (born 1958), Russian reporter working for Channel One
 Oleg Leontyev (1920–?), Soviet geomorphologist
 Sergei Leontiev (1879 or 1880 – after 1932), Russian politician
 Valentina Leontieva (1923–2007), Soviet TV anchor
 Valery Leontiev (born 1949), Russian pop singer
 Viktor Leontyev (born 1940), Soviet Olympic gymnast
 Wassily Leontief (1905–1999), economist

Russian-language surnames